Damien Christensen (born 16 October 1963) is a former Australian rules footballer in the Victorian Football League. Christensen played 17 games for the Geelong Football Club. After his playing career, Christensen has coached the Geelong Falcons and the Box Hill Hawks

Christensen's brother Marty and nephew Allen have also played for Geelong.

References

External links
 

Living people
1963 births
Australian rules footballers from Victoria (Australia)
Geelong Football Club players
Lara Football Club players
Box Hill Football Club coaches